Juan Fernando Cristo (born 11 July 1964) is a Colombian lawyer and politician, who was a Colombian Senator from 1998-2014 Minister of the Interior from 2014-2017. In this capacity, he played a key role in negotiating and implementing the peace accords signed with FARC.

Juan Fernando Cristo is the son of Colombian senator Jorge Cristo Sahium, who was assassinated in 1997. He studied law at the University of the Andes. Starting in 1993, he served Colombia as a diplomat for several years. After his father's assassination, he ran for the Colombian senate, an office he held from 1998-2014. During his last year in office, he was president of the Senate. From 2014-2017, he was the Minister of the Interior for the second government of Juan Manuel Santos.

On May 25, 2017, Cristo announced his candidacy for Colombian's presidency in the 2018 election. However, he lost the Liberal Party candidacy to Humberto de la Calle, who subsequently lost the general election to right-wing candidate Iván Duque Márquez.

References

1964 births
Living people
Colombian Liberal Party politicians
University of Los Andes (Colombia) alumni